The 2022 season was the Minnesota Vikings' 62nd in the National Football League (NFL), their seventh playing home games at U.S. Bank Stadium and their first under new general manager Kwesi Adofo-Mensah and new head coach Kevin O'Connell, following the firings of Rick Spielman and Mike Zimmer at the end of the 2021 season.

With a 33–30 overtime win over the Buffalo Bills in Week 10, the Vikings started 8–1 for the first time since 2009. They improved upon their 8–9 record from 2021 with a Thanksgiving Day victory over the New England Patriots. They clinched the NFC North for the first time since 2017 after a Week 15 win over the Indianapolis Colts. However, the Vikings were eliminated in the Wild Card round of the playoffs after losing 31–24 at home to the New York Giants.

The Vikings received criticism throughout the season due to most of their wins being within one score (11 of 13 wins) and most of their losses being blowouts. The Vikings ranked 31st in total yards allowed (6,608) and finished the season with a negative point differential (−3), the first time this had been done by a team with at least 12 wins. Some of those claims subsided after the win over the Colts, in which the Vikings completed the largest comeback in NFL history; having trailed 33–0 at halftime, they rallied to win 39–36 in overtime.

Transactions

Free agency

Draft

Draft trades

Despite initially announcing Virginia Tech wide receiver Tré Turner as one of their UDFAs, Turner ultimately signed with the Las Vegas Raiders, who offered him a better contract.

Staff

Offseason changes

Head coach

On January 10, 2022, the Vikings fired head coach Mike Zimmer, who had led the team to two NFC North titles and three NFL playoffs appearances in his eight years in charge. On February 16, 2022, former Los Angeles Rams offensive coordinator Kevin O'Connell was named the 10th head coach in franchise history.

General manager

The Minnesota Vikings fired tenth-year general manager Rick Spielman on January 10, 2022, who most notably led the organization to draft Adrian Peterson, Percy Harvin, Harrison Smith, Teddy Bridgewater and Anthony Barr, among other draftees. The Vikings hired Cleveland Browns VP of Football Operations Kwesi Adofo-Mensah on January 26, 2022. Initially, Adofo-Mensah and Kansas City Chiefs Executive Director of Player Personnel Ryan Poles were the finalists for the general manager position. However, Poles withdrew on January 25, 2022 for the general manager position at the Chicago Bears, which ultimately resulted in Adofo-Mensah being hired.

Final roster

Preseason

Schedule
The Vikings' preseason opponents and schedule were announced on May 12, 2022. They traveled to face the Las Vegas Raiders and the Denver Broncos either side of a home game against the San Francisco 49ers. They lost all three games by between 6 and 10 points.

Game summaries

Week 1: at Las Vegas Raiders

Week 2: vs. San Francisco 49ers

Week 3: at Denver Broncos

Regular season

Schedule
On May 4, the NFL announced that the Vikings will play the New Orleans Saints at Tottenham Hotspur Stadium in London, United Kingdom, on October 2, as part of the league's International Series. The game would kick off at 2:30 p.m. BST/8:30 a.m. CDT, televised by the NFL Network, with the Saints serving as the home team. On May 9, the NFL announced that the Vikings will play at the Philadelphia Eagles at 7:30 p.m.

The remainder of the Vikings' 2022 schedule, with exact dates and times, were announced on May 12. In addition to their usual six games home and away against their NFC North rivals, the Vikings will also play games against each of the teams from the NFC East and the AFC East, as well as the two teams that, like the Vikings, finished in second place in their divisions in the NFC West and NFC South in 2021: the Arizona Cardinals and the aforementioned Saints. The Vikings' week 15 matchup will be against the Indianapolis Colts, one of the second-placed teams from the American Football Conference (AFC) whom they were not originally scheduled to play in 2022.

Note: Intra-division opponents are in bold text.

Game summaries

Week 1: vs. Green Bay Packers

Week 2: at Philadelphia Eagles

Week 3: vs. Detroit Lions

Week 4: at New Orleans Saints
NFL London Games

Week 5: vs. Chicago Bears

Week 6: at Miami Dolphins

Week 8: vs. Arizona Cardinals

Week 9: at Washington Commanders

Week 10: at Buffalo Bills

In Week 10 against the Buffalo Bills, after forcing a quick three-and-out, the Vikings took an early lead on a 22-yard pass from Kirk Cousins to Justin Jefferson; however, following a big kick return, the Bills responded immediately, as Devin Singletary ran it in from five yards. The Vikings punted on the ensuing possession, allowing the Bills to take the lead on another Singletary run, this time from one yard. Cousins then threw an interception, but this time the defense was able to hold Buffalo to a field goal, keeping the score at 17–7 as the game ticked into the second quarter. The Vikings then drove down to the Bills' 2-yard line, but a tackle for loss on Alexander Mattison, followed by an offensive pass interference call against T. J. Hockenson meant they had to settle for a field goal. Just as the Bills were looking like going on another scoring drive, the ball was punched out of Singletary's hands and returned 40 yards by Camryn Bynum. Midway inside the Buffalo half at the two-minute warning, the Vikings were faced with a 3rd-and-1 situation, but were unable to convert on successive passes from Cousins to Jefferson and then K. J. Osborn, resulting in a turnover on downs. A long run from Josh Allen then set up the Bills for another scoring drive, culminating in an 11-yard touchdown pass from Allen to Gabe Davis. The Vikings had to punt on the following drive, which meant the Bills took a 24–10 lead into the interval.

The Vikings began the second half with the ball, but after big gains by Jefferson and Dalvin Cook, Cousins threw an interception to Dane Jackson. The Bills managed to get the ball into Vikings territory on the next drive, but a 13-yard sack on Allen by Za'Darius Smith pushed them back into their own territory, forcing a punt. Despite gains by Hockenson and Osborn, though, the Vikings were also forced into kicking the ball away. Gains from former Viking Stefon Diggs and Dawson Knox then set up a 45-yard field goal for the Bills; however, on the Vikings' next play from scrimmage, Cook ran 81 yards for a touchdown, cutting the deficit to 10 points. On the Bills' next possession, following a spectacular, one-handed catch from Diggs on 3rd-and-15 to keep the drive going as the third quarter ended, Allen combined with Davis and Diggs again to get into the red zone; however, attempting to find Knox in the end zone, Allen then threw an interception to Patrick Peterson, who returned it 39 yards to the Vikings' 34-yard line. On the ensuing possession, the Vikings worked the ball downfield and made it into the red zone on a 21-yard catch by Adam Thielen, before Cousins took it down to the 3-yard line on a 15-yard scramble. Following an incompletion to Jefferson, fullback C. J. Ham ran the ball into the end zone, only for Greg Joseph to hit the upright with the extra point, leaving the Vikings down 27–23. The Vikings defense then prevented the Bills from making a first down, giving them the ball back with 3:28 left in the fourth quarter.

The Vikings were soon faced with a 4th-and-18 situation, only for Cousins to complete a 32-yard pass to Jefferson, who caught it one-handed between the hands of the defender, Cam Lewis, getting them into Bills territory. A 9-yard completion to Thielen followed, which had 15 yards added to it for an unnecessary roughness penalty against Christian Benford for the Bills. Jefferson was again the target on the next play, a 14-yard completion getting the Vikings down to the 3-yard line. A slip by Cousins on the next play backed the Vikings up three yards, but another completion to Jefferson on 3rd-and-goal saw him roll into the end zone. The play was originally ruled a touchdown, but a booth review meant he was ruled down at the 1-yard line. With the Vikings facing fourth down, Cousins attempted to find Cook in the flat, only for the ball to fall incomplete; however, the Vikings were given a reprieve by a defensive offside penalty. With the ball less than a foot from the goal line, Cousins attempted to sneak it in himself, but he was stopped short and the Vikings turned it over on downs; however, on the next play, the Bills fumbled the snap and Vikings linebacker Eric Kendricks pounced on it in the end zone for a touchdown. Joseph kicked the extra point to put the Vikings up by three points with 41 seconds left. The Bills had no timeouts, but they were able to make their way downfield with completions to Knox, Davis and Isaiah McKenzie, who were all able to get out of bounds to stop the clock. Allen took a deep shot to Gabe Davis on the next play that fell incomplete, but the officials deemed Andrew Booth Jr. to have committed a pass interference penalty, getting the Bills to the Vikings' 11-yard line with 5 seconds to play. With not enough time for a shot to the end zone, the Bills settled for the game-tying field goal, which Tyler Bass converted.

In overtime, the Vikings won the toss and received the ball first. They made their way down to the Bills' 2-yard line thanks to big gains from Cook on the ground and Jefferson through the air, as well as a defensive pass interference penalty against Benford; however, a loss of yardage on a Cook run, followed by a Cousins sack and an incompletion to Thielen meant the Vikings had to settle for a field goal with 3:45 left in the additional period. The Bills quickly made their way into Vikings territory thanks to runs by Allen, and back-to-back seven-yard catches by Diggs got them comfortably into field goal range. On the edge of the red zone, Allen took a shot to the end zone but the pass intended for Knox was broken up by Duke Shelley. Allen went back to the end zone on the next play with a pass intended for Davis, but it was again intercepted by Peterson, giving the Vikings the win to take them to 8–1 for the first time since 2009.

Week 11: vs. Dallas Cowboys

Week 12: vs. New England Patriots

Week 13: vs. New York Jets

Week 14: at Detroit Lions

Week 15: vs. Indianapolis Colts

The Vikings welcomed the Indianapolis Colts to U.S. Bank Stadium with a third opportunity in as many weeks to clinch the NFC North title; a win or a tie would give them the division title, but they could also afford to lose if the Lions failed to beat the Jets the next day. Despite allowing the Colts to drive down to the Vikings' 1-yard line on the opening possession, the hosts were able to push them back to the 8-yard line, forcing a 26-yard field goal from former Viking Chase McLaughlin. On the ensuing drive, the Vikings were forced to punt, but Ryan Wright's kick was blocked by Ifeadi Odenigbo, another former Viking, and returned 24 yards for a touchdown by JoJo Domann. Dalvin Cook took the opening play of the Vikings' next possession 40 yards into Colts territory, but immediately fumbled on the next play, allowing the Colts to capitalise by capping a 66-yard drive with a 1-yard touchdown run from Deon Jackson. On the Vikings' next drive, they were stopped on 3rd-and-1 and attempted to go for it on 4th down, only to be stopped again, giving the Colts the ball in Vikings territory.

As the game entered the second quarter, the Vikings' defense stood firm, forcing the Colts to kick a field goal. The Vikings were faced with another 4th-and-1 and set up to punt, only for Wright to toss the ball in the direction of Jalen Nailor; however, it fell incomplete and the Vikings turned the ball over on downs again, allowing the Colts to kick another field goal, this time from 49 yards. The two teams then exchanged punts before Vikings quarterback Kirk Cousins threw an interception deep in his own territory that Julian Blackmon returned 17 yards for a touchdown. The Vikings thought they had managed to ignite their offense on the next possession, but a 40-yard completion to K. J. Osborn was overturned after the Colts challenged the play. The Vikings eventually had to punt, and with four minutes left in the half, the Colts drove the ball downfield and kicked a 27-yard field goal to go into the break up 33–0.

To start the second half, the Vikings lost yardage and were again forced to punt; however, they were able to force the Colts into their second punt of the game on the following drive. A big pass from Cousins to Osborn moved the Vikings 63 yards downfield on their next possession, putting them inside the Colts' 5-yard line; after a short gain by Cook, Cousins found Osborn in the end zone for the Vikings' first points of the game. The defense then made a stop as the Colts entered Vikings territory, limiting them to a 52-yard field goal, before the Vikings offense marched downfield to score another touchdown via a 1-yard run from fullback C. J. Ham. They then closed out the third quarter by forcing the Colts into another punt.

They opened the fourth quarter with a 20-yard completion from Cousins to Justin Jefferson, and an unnecessary roughness penalty on Rodney Thomas II added another 15 yards. Another Jefferson catch for 17 yards got the Vikings into the red zone, and the drive was capped by a third Jefferson catch for an 8-yard touchdown, reducing the deficit to 15 points. The Colts punted again on the next possession, and Jalen Reagor returned the kick 51 yards to put the Vikings on the verge of the red zone again, only for the play to be called back for a facemask penalty against Vikings cornerback Kris Boyd. The Vikings made their way downfield, helped by another unnecessary roughness penalty for a hit on Jefferson by Stephon Gilmore, only for Cousins to throw another interception when targeting Reagor on a deep route that the receiver appeared to give up on. The Colts started on their own 2-yard line, but could not capitalize on the turnover as the Vikings forced them to punt once again, and Reagor made a fair catch at midfield. Completions to Adam Thielen (his first target of the game) and Osborn, followed by a pass interference penalty in the end zone, got the Vikings down to the Colts 1-yard line, and they scored a touchdown on the third attempt, when Cousins found Thielen in the end zone. The Colts managed a first down on their next possession, but on the very next play, Jackson fumbled, and Vikings cornerback Chandon Sullivan recovered the ball and returned it for what he thought was a touchdown, only for the officials to rule Jackson to have been down by contact; Sullivan's protestations earned him a 15-yard penalty for unsportsmanlike conduct. On review, the play was confirmed as a fumble, giving the Vikings the ball, but because the officials had whistled, they could not award the touchdown. Following the penalty, the Vikings started just inside their own half, but despite Jefferson picking up a pair of 7-yard catches, the drive stalled. On 4th-and-15, Cousins attempted to run for the first down, but he was tripped and the Vikings turned the ball over on downs for a third time with 2:52 left in the quarter. The Colts moved into Vikings territory, but faced with a 4th-and-1 on the Vikings' 36-yard line, Matt Ryan was stopped short on a quarterback sneak. The Vikings used all three of their timeouts during the Colts' drive, but on the first play of the following possession, Dalvin Cook took a screen pass 64 yards downfield for a touchdown. The Vikings attempted a two-point conversion, and Cousins found T. J. Hockenson in the end zone, tying the game with 2:15 left to play. The teams then traded punts, sending the game to overtime.

The Vikings won the toss ahead of the extra period and elected to receive the ball, but their opening drive stalled following a Cousins sack and an offensive holding penalty against guard Ezra Cleveland. A 14-yard catch by Hockenson put the Vikings on the verge of Greg Joseph's field goal range, but they declined the 57-yard attempt and punted instead. The defense then forced the Colts into a punt following a short drive, leaving the Vikings on their own 18-yard line. After a 6-yard run by Cook, Cousins completed passes to Osborn, Hockenson and Jefferson to get the Vikings down to the Colts' 27-yard line with 20 seconds left to play, and a delay of game penalty against Odenigbo moved them 5 yards closer to the end zone. That presented Joseph with the opportunity for a 40-yard, game-winning field goal. Despite the Colts calling a timeout in an attempt to ice the kicker, Joseph's kick was successful, giving the Vikings a 39–36 win and completing the biggest comeback in NFL history.

With the win, the Vikings improved to 11–3 and won the NFC North. This win was also their first over Indianapolis since 1997, ending a run of six straight losses.

Week 16: vs. New York Giants

Having secured the division title the previous week, the Vikings' next goal was to secure the #2 seed in the NFC and homefield advantage in the postseason until at least the divisional round. After trading punts on the opening four drives, the Vikings opened the scoring towards the end of the first quarter, finishing off an eight-play drive with a 12-yard pass from Kirk Cousins to T. J. Hockenson. The Giants drove into Minnesota territory on the next possession, but after a 16-yard completion from Daniel Jones to Daniel Bellinger to start the second quarter, rookie linebacker Brian Asamoah II punched the ball out and returned it to the Minnesota 36-yard line. The Vikings were able to add to their lead after driving down to the Giants' red zone, but a sack on Cousins on third down pushed them back and they had to settle for a Greg Joseph field goal. The Giants responded with a score of their own as Jones completed five out of five pass attempts and also ran for 14 yards, culminating with a 7-yard touchdown throw to Isaiah Hodgins. The two teams then traded punts on four straight possessions again to end the half with the Vikings leading 10–7.

The Giants tied the game on the opening drive of the second half; after a 22-yard completion to Darius Slayton got them into Vikings territory, the drive stalled but they were able to kick a 44-yard field goal through Graham Gano. After another Vikings punt on the next possession, the Giants were again able to move into the Minnesota half of the field thanks to long passes to Saquon Barkley and Richie James, only for the drive to again stall after pressure from cornerback Patrick Peterson led to Jones being sacked by D. J. Wonnum and Danielle Hunter, leading to another 44-yard field goal by Gano. The Vikings' following possession began with a 16-yard catch from tight end Johnny Mundt, before Cousins attempted to throw to Adam Thielen, only to see the ball intercepted by Cordale Flott; however, the ruling was overturned on review as Flott did not maintain possession as he went to ground. The reprieve allowed the Vikings to continue the drive, which culminated with another touchdown catch for Hockenson from 15 yards out, putting the hosts back in front 17–13 as the game entered the fourth quarter.

The next possession saw the Giants make their way to the Minnesota 32-yard line, where a pass intended for Hodgins was intercepted by Peterson; however, the Vikings were unable to capitalise as their drive stalled just inside the Giants' half. They attempted to go for it on 4th-and-2, but Cousins' deep pass attempt to Justin Jefferson fell incomplete. The Giants were then able to reduce the deficit to a single point; after the turnover, they only managed to go 18 yards, but Gano was successful on a 55-yard field goal attempt. The Vikings then had to punt, before forcing the Giants to do the same, only for Josh Metellus to block Jamie Gillan's kick, giving Minnesota the ball on the Giants' 29-yard line. A 4-yard run from Dalvin Cook and an 8-yard completion to K. J. Osborn gave them a first down, before Cousins found Jefferson over the middle for a 17-yard touchdown to extend the lead to eight points with just over 3 minutes to play. The Giants came back with a quick score of their own, as a 32-yard catch by Slayton was followed up by a 27-yard touchdown run by Barkley, before Jones found Bellinger in the end zone for the two-point conversion, tying the scores at 24–24 with less than a minute taken off the clock. A 16-yard catch from Jefferson on third down got the Vikings to their own 42-yard line, but a sack on Cousins presented them with another third-down after taking their final timeout. On 3rd-and-11, Cousins again found Jefferson for 17 yards, taking the Vikings to the Giants' 42-yard line, where Cousins was able to spike the ball with four seconds left. Joseph was successful with a personal and franchise-record 61-yard field goal, giving the Vikings a 27–24 win and an overall 8–1 record at home on the season.

Week 17: at Green Bay Packers

With the loss, the Vikings not only dropped to the NFC's #3 seed, but also eliminated them from obtaining the #1 seed, thus ensuring the Vikings would begin their playoff run at home in the Wild Card round.

Week 18: at Chicago Bears

Standings

Division

Conference

Postseason

Schedule

Game summaries

NFC Wild Card Playoffs: vs. (6) New York Giants

Statistics

Team leaders

Source: Pro-Football-Reference.com

League rankings

Source: ProFootballReference.com

References

External links
 

Minnesota
Minnesota Vikings seasons
Minnesota Vikings
NFC North championship seasons